The year 1970 in television involved some significant events.
Below is a list of notable television-related events in that year.

Events
January 1 – WXTV becomes a full time Spanish-language station based in Paterson, New Jersey, which it remains into the 21st century, in this case, becomes an affiliate of SIN, the network's first affiliate east of the Mississippi River.
January 3 – Jon Pertwee makes his first appearance as the Third Doctor in the Doctor Who serial Spearhead from Space. It also marks the first time that the series is broadcast in colour.
January 19 – CBS in the United States launches Operation 100, a plan to beat NBC's ratings in the last 100 days of the season, using the slogan "The man can't bust our network."
February 7 – The Hollywood Palace variety series airs its 192nd and final hour-long episode on ABC, with Bing Crosby in his 31st appearance as guest host.
March 7 – The "eclipse of the century" is covered by all three American networks.
March 16 – The FCC's "Miami channel 10 case" comes to a definite end as the station becomes WPLG.
March 26 – The first privately owned television station in Thailand, Channel 3, opens in Bangkok.
April 1 – President Richard Nixon signs the Public Health Cigarette Smoking Act into law, banning cigarette television advertisements in the United States, starting on January 1, 1971.
April 6 - The Action News format made its debut on WFIL-TV (now WPVI-TV, an ABC O&O)
May 31 – WAPI-TV 13 in Birmingham, Alabama, ends nine years of dual affiliation with NBC and CBS, becoming an exclusive affiliate of NBC, and WBMG 42 in Birmingham, WCFT-33 in Tuscaloosa and WHMA-40 in Anniston affiliate exclusively with CBS. Previously, Channels 33, 40 and 42 aired programming from NBC and CBS that was not aired on Channel 13.
July 31 – Chet Huntley anchors his final newscast with David Brinkley and retires, bringing down the curtain on a 14-year career at NBC News in the United States and, thus, as chief anchor of The Huntley–Brinkley Report. The next Monday, August 3, the program is renamed NBC Nightly News, the title it retains for at least 40 years.
August 2 – NBC expands full-service newscasts to seven nights a week with NBC Sunday News; it replaces The Frank McGee Report.
September 7 – Independent Television of Vietnam, as predecessor of Vietnam Television, begins broadcasts Hanoi, Vietnam.   
October 5 – The Public Broadcasting Service (PBS) in the United States begins broadcasting and National Educational Television is shut down.
December 25 – Pluto's Christmas Tree is broadcast on BBC1 in the United Kingdom, the first complete Mickey Mouse cartoon to be shown on television in colour, despite the colour strike causing Christmas programmes that year to air in Black & White.
In a cliffhanger on the American soap opera Search for Tomorrow, businessman Sam Reynolds is believed to be dead after perishing in Africa. One of the first "exotic" deaths for a soap opera character, it is in tune with actor Robert Mandan's wish to leave the show.
"Country" comedian and Grand Ole Opry star Minnie Pearl makes her first appearance on Hee Haw.
Lloyd Robertson replaces Warren Davis as anchor of CBC Television's The National.

Programs/programmes

60 Minutes (1968–present)
American Bandstand (1952–1989)
Another World (1964–1999)
As the World Turns (1956–2010)
Bewitched (1964–1972)
Blue Peter (UK) (1958–present)
Bonanza (1959–1973)
Bozo the Clown (1949–present)
Bright Promise (1969–1972)
Candid Camera (1948–present)
Captain Kangaroo (1955–1984)
Clangers (UK) (1969–1972)
Come Dancing (UK) (1949–1995)
Coronation Street (1960–present)
Crossroads (UK) (1964–1988, 2001–2003)
Dad's Army (UK) (1968–1977)
Dark Shadows (1966–1971)
Days of Our Lives (1965–present)
Dixon of Dock Green (UK) (1955–1976)
Doctor Who (UK) (1963–1989, 1996, 2005–present)
Face the Nation (1954–present)
Family Affair (1966–1971)
Four Corners (Australia) (1961–present)
General Hospital (1963–present)
Grandstand (UK) (1958–2007)
Green Acres (1965–1971)
Gunsmoke (1955–1975)
Hallmark Hall of Fame (1951–present)
Hawaii Five-O (1968–1980)
Hee Haw (1969–1993)
Here's Lucy (1968–1974)
Hogan's Heroes (1965–1971)
Ironside (1967–1975)
It's Academic (1961–present)
Jeopardy! (1964–1975, 1984–present)
Julia (1968–1971)
Kimba the White Lion (1966–1967), re-runs
Laugh-In (1968–1973)
Love is a Many Splendored Thing (1967–1973)
Love of Life (1951–1980)
Love, American Style (1969–1974)
Magpie (UK) (1968–1980)
Mannix (1967–1975)
Marcus Welby, M.D. (1969–1976)
Mayberry R.F.D. (1968–1971)
Meet the Press (1947–present)
Mission: Impossible (1966–1973)
Monty Python's Flying Circus (UK) (1969–1974)
My Three Sons (1960–1972)
One Life to Live (1968–2012)
Opportunity Knocks (UK) (1956–1978)
Panorama (UK) (1953–present)
Play School (1966–present)
Room 222 (1969–1974)
Search for Tomorrow (1951–1986)
Sesame Street (1969–present)
Soul Train (1971-2006)
That Girl (1966–1971)
The Andy Williams Show (1962-1971)
The Benny Hill Show (UK) (1969–1989)
The Beverly Hillbillies (1962–1971)
The Brady Bunch (1969–1974)
The Carol Burnett Show (1967–1978)
The Dean Martin Show (1965–1974)
The Doctors (1963–1982)
The Doris Day Show (1968–1973)
The Ed Sullivan Show (1948–1971)
The Edge of Night (1956–1984)
The Goodies (UK) (1970-1982)
The Good Old Days (UK) (1953–1983)
The Guiding Light (1952–2009)
The Johnny Cash Show (1969–1971)
The Late Late Show (Ireland) (1962–present)
The Lawrence Welk Show (1955–1982)
The Mike Douglas Show (1961–1981)
The Mod Squad (1968–1973)
The Money Programme (UK) (1966–present)
The Newlywed Game (1966–1974)
The Secret Storm (1954–1974)
The Sky at Night (UK) (1957–present)
The Today Show (1952–present)
The Tonight Show Starring Johnny Carson (1962–1992)
The Wonderful World of Disney (1969–1979)
This Is Your Life (UK) (1955–2003)
Tom and Jerry (1965–1972, 1975–1977, 1980–1982)
Top of the Pops (UK) (1964–2006)
Truth or Consequences (1950–1988)
What the Papers Say (UK) (1956–present)
Where the Heart Is (1969–1973)
World of Sport (1965–1985)
Z-Cars (UK) (1962–1978)

Debuts
January 5 – Soap opera All My Children on ABC (–2011)
January 6 – Kate on ITV (–1972)
January 30 – The Tim Conway Show on CBS (ending June 19)
February 17 – McCloud pilot on NBC (–1977); The series becomes a regular show the following fall as part of Four in One
March 30 – Soap opera Somerset on NBC (–1976), while fellow soaps A World Apart (1970–1971) and The Best of Everything (1970) debut on ABC (It marks the last time multiple soaps premiere on the same day in the US)
September 12 – Josie and the Pussycats, on CBS Saturday morning (–1974)
September 16 – UFO on ITV (–1971)
September 17 – The Flip Wilson Show (–1974) and Nancy (–1971) on NBC
September 18 - Headmaster (-1971) on CBS
September 19 – Arnie (–1972) and The Mary Tyler Moore Show (–1977) both on CBS
September 20 – The Tim Conway Comedy Hour on CBS (ending December 13)
September 21 – NFL Monday Night Football on ABC (it moved to ESPN in 2006)
September 24 – The Odd Couple (–1975) and Barefoot in the Park (–1971) both on ABC
September 25 
The Partridge Family on ABC (–1974)
Adventures in Rainbow Country on CBC (–1971)
Doomwatch on BBC1 (–1972)
Party Game (–1980)
Play for Today supersedes The Wednesday Play on BBC1; the anthology drama series lasts until 1984
November – Mr Benn on BBC in syndication
November 8 - The Goodies on BBC2
December – I racconti di padre Brown on RAI (–February 1971)

Ending this year

Births

Deaths

See also

 1970–71 United States network television schedule

References